Heliantheini is one of the two tribes that make up the subfamily Lesbiinae of the hummingbird family Trochilidae. The other tribe in the subfamily is Lesbiini.

The informal name "brilliants" has been proposed for this group as it includes the genus Heliodoxa that has nine species with "brilliant" in their common name.

The tribe contains 53 species divided into 14 genera.

Phylogeny
A molecular phylogenetic study of the hummingbirds published in 2007 found that the family was composed of nine major clades. When Edward Dickinson and James Van Remsen, Jr. updated the Howard and Moore Complete Checklist of the Birds of the World for the 4th edition in 2013 they divided the hummingbirds into six subfamilies and proposed using the name Heliantheini for one of the two tribes in the subfamily Lesbiinae. The tribe Heliantheini had been introduced (as a subfamily Heliantheinae) by the German naturalist Ludwig Reichenbach in 1854.

Cladogram
Molecular phylogenetic studies by Jimmy McGuire and collaborators published between 2007 and 2014 determined the relationships between the major groups of hummingbirds. In the cladogram below the English names are those introduced in 1997. The Latin names are those proposed by Dickinson and Remsen in 2013.

The phylogeny of the Heliantheini based on a molecular phylogenetic study published in 2014 is shown below. Loddigesia (marvelous spatuletail) was found to be embedded within Eriocnemis.

Taxonomic list
The tribe contains 14 genera.

References

Sources

 

Bird tribes